James John Hannan (January 7, 1940 in Jersey City, New Jersey) is an American retired professional baseball player who pitched in Major League Baseball from 1962 to 1971 for the Washington Senators, Detroit Tigers and Milwaukee Brewers.

Hannan began his baseball career at St. Peter's Preparatory School, which inducted him in 2005 into the first class of its athletic hall of fame. He attended the University of Notre Dame and signed with the Boston Red Sox in time for the 1961 minor league season.  After posting a 17–7 win–loss record and leading the Class D New York–Penn League in strikeouts, he was selected by Washington in the first-year player draft. His MLB service, which lasted all or part of ten years, began the following season. In his best campaign, 1968 for Washington, Hannan posted a 10–6 (3.01) record in 25 games pitched for a last-place team that lost 96 games.

After the 1970 campaign, he was included in a multi-player trade with the Detroit Tigers in which he, fellow right-hander Joe Coleman, shortstop Ed Brinkman and third baseman Aurelio Rodríguez were sent to Detroit for former 30-game-winner Denny McLain and three other players. Coleman, Brinkman and Rodríguez were three of the Senators' top players; they became mainstays in Detroit and helped lead the Tigers to the  American League East Division championship. McLain was acquired as an attendance-booster for the struggling Senators. He had gone a combined 55–13 for the Tigers in 1968–69 but spent the beginning of 1970 under suspension for gambling allegations. Upon returning, he could not approach his old form, and with the 1971 Senators, he lost 22 games and the team went 63–96 and abandoned Washington for Dallas–Fort Worth.

For his part, Hannan only got into seven games for the 1971 Tigers and was effective in middle relief, before being traded to the Brewers, where he finished his career with 21 appearances, 20 in relief, for Milwaukee.

During his MLB career, Hannan appeared in 276 games, with 101 starting assignments. He compiled a 41–48 record, with a career earned run average of 3.88, allowing 807 hits and 408 bases on balls in 822 innings pitched. He struck out 438, and posted nine complete games, four shutouts and seven saves.

References

External links

1940 births
Living people
Baseball players from Jersey City, New Jersey
Buffalo Bisons (minor league) players
Detroit Tigers players
Hawaii Islanders players
Major League Baseball pitchers
Milwaukee Brewers players
Notre Dame Fighting Irish baseball players
Olean Red Sox players
Richmond Virginians (minor league) players
St. Peter's Preparatory School alumni
Syracuse Chiefs players
Toronto Maple Leafs (International League) players
Washington Senators (1961–1971) players